Damir Muratuly Ryspayev (Damir Mūratūly Ryspaev; born 25 April 1995) is a Kazakh professional ice hockey defenceman currently playing for Nomad Nur-Sultan of the Supreme Hockey League (VHL).

Brawl vs Kunlun Red Star
On 8 August 2016, during an exhibition game against Kunlun Red Star, Ryspayev started a brawl that caused the game to get cancelled after just three minutes. The brawl began when Ryspayev punched Tomáš Marcinko as he was checking him, and escalated when Ryspayev decided to attack the other Red Star players, seemingly at random. Eventually, after trying to attack players on the Red Star bench, Ryspayev was ejected from the game with the rest of the game getting cancelled. He was suspended by the KHL for the remainder of the exhibition season and faced a hearing for further discipline. On 18 August 2016 Ryspayev received a lifetime ban from the league, with a representative of the league's Council of Directors stating that the league could not allow its rules to be "systematically and grotesquely violated".

On December 27, 2017, the lifetime ban on Ryspayev was lifted.

References

External links

1995 births
Living people
Barys Nur-Sultan players
Kazakhstani ice hockey defencemen
Nomad Astana players
Sportspeople from Oskemen
Snezhnye Barsy players
Ice hockey controversies
Banned sportspeople